Bixby is a city in Tulsa and Wagoner counties in the U.S. state of Oklahoma, and is a suburb of Tulsa. The population was 28,609 at the 2020 census and 20,884 in the 2010 census, an increase of 13.70 percent In 2010, Bixby became the 19th largest city in Oklahoma. It is nicknamed "The Garden Spot of Oklahoma" for its rich agrarian heritage.  Though one of the fastest-growing communities in Oklahoma, it remains a sod-growing center and a popular location for purchasing fresh vegetables. The per capita income of $36,257 is the highest in the Tulsa Metropolitan area and is more than 50 percent higher than the state average. In 2009, CNN Money.com placed Bixby No. 67 on its list of 100 Best Places to Live.

History
 Alexander Posey, a member of the Muscogee (Creek) Nation, and his family settled in the area now known as Bixby in the late 1800s. He founded a community that was initially known as "Posey on Posey Creek," and included two saloons, a blacksmith shop, and a general store. The town became a government townsite with a post office in 1895. Located in the Muscogee (Creek) Nation, Indian Territory, Bixby was named in honor of Tams Bixby, a chairman of the Dawes Commission. The original  townsite plat was approved by the Dawes Commission in 1902. Many settlers were attracted to the area by the rich, though sometimes swampy river bottom land. In 1904 the Midland Valley Railroad laid tracks and built a depot about 1/2 mile north of the original town of Bixby. This created factions that briefly split Bixby into two towns. The new part of town was deliberately surveyed so that the new streets did not align with the existing ones. However, businesses in the original town soon moved to the new location and built permanent brick buildings there. The first mayor, recorder and five aldermen were elected in February 1907. In 1911, a two-story brick schoolhouse was built on Main Street. Bixby Central Elementary is now near the original site. A traffic bridge was built over the Arkansas River in 1911, and for a time was said to be the longest bridge west of the Mississippi River.

Fry, a community located north of the original townsite but later annexed by Bixby, served the surrounding trade area when the only way to get across the Arkansas River was by way of the Shellenberger Ferry. Fry's post office operated from 1896 until 1909.

The Bixby Bulletin, the town's first newspaper, began publication in February 1905. It continued publication until 2005. A second paper, the Bixby Journal existed only from 1907 until 1910.

Bixby was impacted and enriched by the discovery of nearby natural gas deposits in 1905-1906 and oil fields in 1913, but farming remained the backbone of the community well into the 20th Century. Early farmers focused on production of cotton, wheat and alfalfa in the rich river bottom. During the 1930s, truck farming of vegetables slowly replaced those crops. In 1941, Bixby became an important regional center for shipping produce by railroads. It was at that time that Bixby was christened with its nickname "The Garden Spot of Oklahoma," a designation still carried on the town seal and public vehicles. Cantaloupes, potatoes, radishes, squash, turnips, spinach and sweet corn were shipped from Bixby all over the U.S. In time, the majority of the truck farms were converted to the production of sod, typically Bermuda grass, or developed for residential and other purposes. Only a small percentage of Bixby residents now work in agriculture, but the town continues to celebrate its earthy roots with the yearly "Green Corn Festival" in June.

Another point of history commemorated by Bixby is the 1832 visit to the area by the famous American writer Washington Irving.  Irving accompanied a U.S. Army exploration party on an excursion from Fort Gibson west onto the prairie and the lands occupied by the Osage and Pawnee tribes. He described his adventure in his book A Tour on the Prairies (1835). In it, he relates camping in a grove of large trees on the banks of the Arkansas River in what is present-day Bixby. The town has honored his visit by the creation of Washington Irving Park and Arboretum near the location. The park contains an amphitheatre stage patterned after the front facade of Irving's home, Sunnyside, in Tarrytown, New York, as well as gates near the park entrance that are replicas of ones at Irving's estate. A bronze statue of Washington Irving sits near the stage.  Bixby Middle School drama students present a popular retelling of Irving's The Legend of Sleepy Hollow in the park each October. The park is also the location of the heavily attended "Bixby BBQ & Music Festival" each May and the Bixby "Deutschesfest" in September.

Geography
Bixby is located at  (35.960898, −95.878258). According to the United States Census Bureau, the city has a total area of 25.1 square miles (65.0 km), of which 24.0 square miles (62.3 km) is land and 1.0 square mile (2.7 km) (4.15%) is water. The town is bisected into north and south portions by the Arkansas River; the original town center is located south of the river.

Demographics

As of the 2010 census, there were 20,884 people, 7,658 households, and 5,295 families residing in the city. The population density was 889.3 people per square mile (344/km). There were 8,187 housing units at an average density of 319.8 per square mile (94.9/km). The racial makeup of the city was 84.2% White, 1.6% African American, 5.9% Native American, 1.6% Asian, 0.01% Pacific Islander, 1.9% from other races, and 4.8% from two or more races. Hispanic or Latino of any race were 4.9% of the population.

There were 7,658 households, out of which 30.4% had children under the age of 18 living with them, 64.4% were married couples living together, 8.9% had a female householder with no husband present, and 22.6% were non-families. 19.2% of all households were made up of individuals, and 7.9% had someone living alone who was 65 years of age or older. The average household size was 2.72 and the average family size was 3.12.

In the city, the population was spread out, with 28.8% under the age of 18, 7.9% from 18 to 24, 31.7% from 25 to 44, 21.8% from 45 to 64, and 9.8% who were 65 years of age or older. The median age was 34 years. For every 100 females, there were 98.3 males. For every 100 females age 18 and over, there were 95.2 males.

The median income for a household in the city was $73,163 and the median income for a family was $85,000. The per capita income for the city was $37,368. About 5.5% of the total population were below the poverty line. Of the city's population over the age of 25, 37.8% hold a bachelor's degree or higher.

Government
Bixby has a Council/City Manager form of government. 
As of 2022, the Mayor is Brian Guthrie and the Vice Mayor is Paul Blair.

Points of interest
 Washington Irving Memorial Park and Arboretum
 SpiritBank Event Center
 Plummer’s Service Station from 1921 in downtown Bixby, a restoration project of the Bixby Historical Society.

Education
Bixby Public Schools are in the Bixby School District. There are nine schools in the district, including Bixby High School, Bixby 9th Grade Center, Bixby Middle School for 7th through 8th, Bixby North Intermediate, Bixby Central Intermediate, Bixby East Intermediate, Bixby East Elementary, Bixby North Elementary, Bixby Central Elementary and upcoming Bixby West Intermediate and Elementary.

For the 2011 school year, there were approximately 5,000 students.

Media

Newspaper
Bixby has one newspaper, the Bixby Bulletin. The paper is published every Thursday. It is owned by Community Publishers, a newspaper and Internet publisher and commercial printer that serves Oklahoma, Missouri, and Arkansas.

Television
Cox Communications Cable channel 24.3 is the Bixby Government-access television (GATV) cable TV municipal information channel. It displays, among other things, information about the city government, city council meeting, upcoming events, and general information about the city. The channel also features local sports and weather reports.

Communications
Bixby Telephone Company, commonly known as BTC Broadband, is a well-known company in the Bixby community, and has been providing internet services since 1993 and telephone services since 1914. BTC Broadband is one of the first companies in Oklahoma to offer a gigabit connection over fiber optic cables to select neighborhoods. In addition to adding fiber optic support to existing neighborhoods, BTC Broadband is active in working with local developers to ensure select areas are pre-installed with fiber optic support.

Cultural references
Bixby has been used as the setting for at least two popular works of fiction.  The best-selling novel Tex (1979) by S.E. Hinton tells the story of its title character, a troubled teen in rural Bixby.  The 1982 film adaption, starring Matt Dillon, was filmed on location and features the Bixby High School as well as various other locations around the town. Also, the Midnighters trilogy (begun in 2004) by Scott Westerfeld tells the supernatural story of a group of five Bixby High School students.

 Bixby, Oklahoma is the setting of Scott Westerfeld's "Midnighters Trilogy", in which the location of Bixby on an exact point along the 36th parallel creates a secret hour at midnight where everyone is frozen, except for five teenagers born at the stroke of midnight.
 The majority of the movie Tex was shot in Bixby. The characters attend Bixby High School and drive through Bixby, as well as Tulsa.
 Bixby was also featured in a Roy D. Mercer radio bit. In the comedic telephone exchange, Mercer calls "International Tours of Bixby," a legitimate travel agency, seeking a tour of Bixby, supposedly unaware that this is not the primary focus of the business.

Bixby was also referenced as being near the setting of Tremors with Kevin Bacon.

Notable people

 Notable former or current residents of Bixby include comedian Rodney Carrington, hot rod artist Coop, Florida International University football coach Butch Davis, professional wrestler "Cowboy" Bill Watts, football cornerback Chris Harris, NASCAR driver Tanner Berryhill, country singer Corey Kent, World of Outlaws driver Shane Stewart, and Cleveland Indians outfielder Roy Foster.

References

External links
 City of Bixby
 Bixby Chamber of Commerce
 Bixby Historical Society
 "Bixby."  Encyclopedia of Oklahoma History and Culture

Cities in Tulsa County, Oklahoma
Cities in Wagoner County, Oklahoma
Cities in Oklahoma
Tulsa metropolitan area
Oklahoma populated places on the Arkansas River